Mysterious Mr. Moto, produced in 1938 by Twentieth Century Fox, is the fifth in a series of eight films starring Peter Lorre as Mr. Moto.

The film is based on the character of Mr. Moto created by John P. Marquand, from an original screenplay by Philip MacDonald and Norman Foster.

It was originally known as Mysterious Mr. Moto of Devil's Island.

Synopsis
The film opens with a daring escape from the French penal colony on Devil's Island.  Mr. Moto, pretending to be Ito Matsuka, a Japanese murderer, is in the company of Paul Brissac, who belongs to a group of assassins.  Brissac changes his name to Romero when they arrive in London and Moto stays on as his houseboy.

Moto then uncovers a plot to assassinate pacifist industrialist Anton Darvak.

Cast
 Peter Lorre as Mr. Kentaro Moto
 Mary Maguire as Ann Richman
 Henry Wilcoxon as Anton Darvak
 Erik Rhodes as David Scott-Frensham
 Harold Huber as Ernst Litmar
 Leon Ames as Paul Brissac (alias Romero)
 Forrester Harvey as George Higgins
 Fredrik Vogeding as Gottfried Brujo
 Lester Matthews as Sir Charles Murchison
 John Rogers as Sniffy
 Karen Sorrell as Lotus Liu

Production
Henry Wilcoxon replaced Michael Whalen in the cast. It was an early Hollywood role for Australian actor Mary Maguire.

Filming took place in March and April 1938, shortly after completion of Mr Moto's Gamble.

During filming Peter Lorre, as Moto, impersonated a seventy-year-old German painter.

Reception
The film was released in May 1938. The Los Angeles Times praised the "exciting action". It arrived in New York in September.

Home media
This film, along with Think Fast, Mr. Moto, Thank You, Mr. Moto and Mr. Moto Takes a Chance, was released on DVD in 2006 by 20th Century Fox as part of The Mr. Moto Collection, Volume One.

See also
Think Fast, Mr. Moto 
Thank You, Mr. Moto
Mr. Moto's Gamble 
Mr. Moto Takes a Chance 
Mr. Moto's Last Warning 
Mr. Moto in Danger Island
Mr. Moto Takes a Vacation
The Return of Mr. Moto

References

External links
 
 
 
 

1938 films
1930s mystery films
American black-and-white films
American mystery films
Films directed by Norman Foster
Films set on Devil's Island
Films set in London
20th Century Fox films
Films scored by Samuel Kaylin
1930s American films